List of surviving cruise ships and liners built in the 20th century. Chronological by decade the ship was built:

1910s

1930s

1940s

1950s

1960s

1970s

1980s

1990s

References 

Cruise lines
Cruise ships
20th-century ships